LATAM Airlines Brasil, formerly TAM Linhas Aéreas, is the Brazilian brand of LATAM Airlines Group and the national flag carrier of Brazil operating international and domestic flights from hubs in Rio, São Paulo, and Brasília. According to the National Civil Aviation Agency of Brazil (ANAC), between January and December 2019, LATAM had 34.7% of the domestic, and 20.9% of the international market share in terms of passenger-kilometers flown, making it the second largest domestic and largest international airline in Brazil.

Before the takeover, TAM was Brazil's and Latin America's largest airline. Its headquarters are in São Paulo, operating scheduled services to destinations within Brazil, as well as international flights to Europe and other parts of North and South America. Shares in the company were traded on the São Paulo Exchange (BM&F Bovespa) and New York Stock Exchange as "TAM". Prior to the merger with LAN, the company closed its capital, transferring its shares to LATAM Airlines Group. However, in August 2015, it was announced that the two airlines would fully rebrand as LATAM, with one livery to be applied on all aircraft by 2018. The airline withdrew from the Star Alliance and joined Oneworld, effective 31 March, 2014. The carrier left Oneworld on May 1, 2020.

History

The Origins: TAM – Táxi Aéreo Marília

TAM – Táxi Aéreo Marília and TAM – Transportes Aéreos Regionais were two different entities, although both belonged to the TAM Group. TAM – Marília, an air taxi company founded on February 21, 1961 at the city of Marília, provided the start-up infrastructure for TAM – Regionais.

TAM – Transportes Aéreos Regionais (KK)
On November 11, 1975, the Government of Brazil created the Brazilian Integrated System of Regional Air Transportation and divided the country in five different regions, for which five newly created regional airlines received a concession to operate air services. Founded by Rolim Adolfo Amaro TAM – Transportes Aéreos Regionais S/A was the third of those regional airlines to be made operational. Its services started on July 12, 1976, and its operational area comprised parts of the Southeast and Central West regions of Brazil, specifically the states of Mato Grosso do Sul, and parts of Mato Grosso, and São Paulo plus the possibility of serving the cities of Cuiabá, Rio de Janeiro, Londrina, Maringá, and Brasília when linking them to its area of concession.

TAM – Linhas Aéreas Regionais was formed as a joint-venture between TAM – Táxi Aéreo Marília and VASP, the latter of which was then a state-owned airline. The airline received the IATA code KK on October 13, 1999. The new airline flew Embraer EMB 110 Bandeirantes at first, but these proved grossly inadequate for the task at hand, and even at full capacity needed to be subsidized by the government in order to be profitable.

TAM went on to purchase three used Fokker F27 turboprops, which were subsequently refurbished by Fokker in the Netherlands. In order to obtain the import authorization for the aircraft, a deal was struck with the government in which TAM was forced to maintain three Bandeirantes for every F27, as well as removing five seats from each one, bringing the F27's capacity down to 40 passengers. A fourth F27, previously owned by Air New Zealand, was added to the TAM fleet in 1981. By 1983, TAM had acquired 10 F27s. By 1981, TAM had flown 1 million passengers, and 2 million by 1984.

TAM (KK) joint operations with TAM (JJ)

In August 1986, the company, under financial stress, went public and began floating stock in the market. The same year, TAM – Transportes Aéreos Regionais (KK) acquired another regional airline, VOTEC, which operated in areas of northern and central Brazil. VOTEC was then renamed Brasil Central Linhas Aéreas. TAM and Brasil Central were both regional airlines and operated in different designated areas. They, however, operated as a consortium with integrated networks and fleet, with the most notable differences being the flight number IATA codes (whereas TAM had the IATA code KK, Brasil Central operated with the code JJ inherited from VOTEC), the different color schemes of the aircraft, and their designated areas of operation. In 1988, TAM flew its 3 millionth passenger.

On May 15, 1990, the Brazilian Government lifted restrictions on operational areas of regional airlines allowing them to fly anywhere in Brazil. As a consequence, Brasil Central was renamed TAM - Transportes Aéreos Meridionais, acquired the same color scheme of TAM (KK) but maintained the IATA code JJ.

In 2000, TAM (KK) was merged into TAM (JJ) and TAM (JJ) was renamed TAM Transportes Aéreos. The code JJ was maintained and the code KK was released back to IATA.

Despite TAM's success in the market, it was evident the airline would not last long when competing against airlines such as Varig and VASP, both of which already possessed Boeing 737s in their fleet. Amaro then tried to buy VASP, which was about to be privatized and called the project "Revolution". Having lost the bid, he opted for slower growth with the gradual addition of new aircraft, re-dubbed "Evolution".

Consolidation of Services

On September 15, 1989, TAM arranged for the acquisition of two Fokker 100 jets. Like the F27s before them, TAM did not actually purchase these aircraft but used Amaro's credibility to arrange for a third-party asset management company, Guinness Peat Aviation, to purchase them and subsequently lease them back to TAM. Two more were added in 1991. In 1992, TAM carried its 8 millionth passenger. By 1993, through the use of the Fokker 100 fleet, which now numbered at 14, TAM was serving 56 cities in Brazil.

In 1996, TAM bought another airline, Helisul Linhas Aéreas, which used the trade name of TAM. In 1997, TAM ordered its first large jets; the airline ordered 45 planes from Airbus, including 10 A330s, 4 A319s, and 34 A320s. In 1997, the Airbuses began to be delivered and the airline flew its first international service from São Paulo to Miami International Airport. In 1998, TAM purchased the passenger division of Itapemirim Transportes Aéreos.

Two years later, in 1999, services to Europe were inaugurated through a code share service with Air France, to Paris-Charles de Gaulle Airport. In 2000, the airline was renamed TAM Linhas Aéreas. Long running discussions to merge with Varig ended in 2004. In 2008, TAM transported 30,144,000 passengers, with an average load factor of 71%. As of 2010, the airline is owned by the Amaro family (46.25%), Amaro Aviation Part (3.52%), treasury stocks (0.27%), and minority shareholders (49.96%). It employed 24,000 staff. On May 13, 2010, TAM became the 27th member of Star Alliance. David Barioni served as the airline's president from 2007 to 2009.

In 2009, TAM decided to replace its Passenger Service System provided by Sabre, known as Sabresonic, with the Altéa platform from Amadeus. The migration to Altéa was completed in the first quarter of 2010.

On March 30, 2011, TAM signed a letter of intentions to purchase up to 31% of the shares of TRIP Linhas Aéreas, a regional airline which code-shares with TAM since 2004. A final decision had however been postponed; and finally, in February 2012, the purchase agreement was not renewed. On May 28, 2012, TRIP was sold to Azul Brazilian Airlines. Code-sharing operations ended on March 28, 2013.

On December 21, 2009, TAM Linhas Aéreas purchased Pantanal Linhas Aéreas. At that time, TAM decided to maintain Pantanal as a separate airline within the TAM Group integrated into the network of TAM. Starting August 1, 2011, Pantanal operated flights on behalf of TAM, all with origin and destination at São-Paulo-Congonhas Airport. On March 26, 2013, Brazilian authorities approved the incorporation of all Pantanal assets by TAM and Pantanal ceased to exist. The incorporation process was completed on August 23, 2013.

In January 2013, the Jet Airliner Crash Data Evaluation Centre (JACDEC) determined that TAM Linhas Aéreas had the second-worst safety record in the world. The ratings take into account the number and deadliness of the hull losses (destroyed airplanes) they have suffered in the past 30 years, how they have fared more recently, and how many flights they have flown without incident. The results do not take into account the cause of the hull losses, or whether the airline is at fault, so they are not a perfect measure of how safely an airline behaves.

The creation of LATAM Airlines Group

On August 13, 2010, TAM signed a non-binding agreement with Chilean airline LAN Airlines to merge and create LATAM Airlines Group. This was changed into a binding agreement on January 19, 2011. LATAM's agreement was approved with 11 restrictions by Chilean authorities on September 21, 2011. These included transferring four slots at São Paulo-Guarulhos to competitors interested in operating flights to Santiago de Chile, renouncing membership to either Oneworld or Star Alliance, restricting increase capacity on flights between Brazil and Chile, and opening code-share possibilities and fidelity program membership to interested competitors. On December 14, 2011, Brazilian authorities approved the agreement imposing similar restrictions as Chilean authorities. By August 2012, LATAM made a decision in favor of Oneworld and frequencies between São Paulo and Santiago de Chile were reduced: TAM had two pairs of slots while LAN had four. LAN ceded two pairs to competitors interested in using them which later was known to be Sky Airline. The merger was completed on June 22, 2012. As of May 5, 2016 TAM adopted the name LATAM. It still continues to use the "TAM" name as a call sign for its LATAM Brasil operated flights.

On July 9, 2020, LATAM Brasil announced that it filed for judicial reorganization in the United States due to the impacts of the COVID-19 crisis on the company's operations. The LATAM Airlines group and its affiliates had already entered the debt restructuring process in May of the same year under the protection of Chapter 11 of the United States bankruptcy law, which allows a deadline for companies to reorganize themselves financially. Despite the announcement, the company continues to operate normally.

Subsidiary: LATAM Paraguay

In 1994, TAM Linhas Aéreas established a small subsidiary airline in Paraguay called Aerolíneas Paraguayas with a fleet consisting mostly of the Cessna 208 Caravans, formerly operated by TAM. On September 1, 1996, TAM via ARPA, purchased 80% of the shares of the former state-owned Líneas Aéreas Paraguayas and merged it with ARPA. The new airline was named TAM – Transportes Aéreos del Mercosur and maintained the IATA code of LAP, PZ. Today TAM owns 94.98% and the Paraguayan government 5.02% of the shares.

In 2008, following a branding strategy, the name TAM Mercosur was dropped and the airline adopted an identical corporate identity of TAM Airlines. However, its corporate structure remained the same. This airline is today informally known as TAM Paraguay, and uses the IATA code PZ. In 2016, the airline was rebranded to LATAM Paraguay, at the same time as all other airlines of the LATAM group.

Destinations

The network of LATAM Brasil and LATAM Paraguay covers Brazil, Paraguay, Europe, North and South America.

Codeshare agreements
LATAM Brasil codeshares with the following airlines:

 Air China
 Air France
 British Airways
 Cathay Pacific
 Delta Air Lines
 Finnair
 Iberia
 Japan Airlines
 Korean Air
 LATAM Chile
 LATAM Paraguay
 Lufthansa 
 Passaredo Linhas Aéreas
 Qatar Airways
 South African Airways
 Swiss International Air Lines 
 Vueling
 WestJet

Fleet

Current fleet
, the LATAM Brasil fleet consists of following aircraft:

Former fleet
LATAM Brasil had also operated these following aircraft since it started services:

Fleet development
On June 16, 2005, TAM purchased 20 additional Airbus A320 family aircraft (including the A319, A320 and A321), with an additional 20 options. These were expected to be delivered between late 2007 and 2010, adding to the already scheduled delivery of 6 A320s between 2006 and 2008. At the same time, the company signed a memorandum of understanding with Airbus stating its intent to buy 10 of the new Airbus A350-900 plus 5 options, with deliveries planned due to commence at the end of 2014. However, LATAM received its first A350 in early 2016.

TAM has also signed a firm contract with Airbus to acquire 37 additional aircraft. The order comprises 12 A319s, 16 A320s, 3 A321s and 3 A330s and includes 12 unspecified extra options. This would bring the number of aircraft in TAM's fleet acquired directly from Airbus to 115 aircraft. The commitments are separate from deals in earlier years for 29 firm-ordered A320s and 20 options. The deliveries were concluded by 2010. In 2013, TAM announced that it would phased out three of the oldest Boeing 767 it operates; however, it later changed plans and decided to keep the aircraft, adding some more aircraft from LAN Airlines instead. They replaced the A330-200s. TAM also received the first aircraft of the A320 family with Sharklets in April 2013.

Fleet maintenance is partially conducted at the technology center at São Carlos Airport.

LATAM Pass

LATAM Pass is the frequent flyer program of LATAM Brasil. Program points can be redeemed for tickets on airlines of the LATAM group and selected partners. It is divided into the following categories and percentages of mileage accrual:

Accidents and incidents

On February 8, 1979, an Embraer EMB 110 Bandeirante registration PT-SBB operating a flight from Bauru to São Paulo-Congonhas, while on initial climb from Bauru, struck trees and crashed into flames. All 2 crew and 16 passengers died.
On October 7, 1983, an Embraer EMB 110C Bandeirante registration PP-SBH flying from Campo Grande and Urubupungá to Araçatuba struck the ground just short of the runway threshold after missing the approach at Araçatuba Airport twice. Seven crew and passengers died.
On June 28, 1984, an Embraer EMB 110C Bandeirante registration PP-SBC operating a chartered flight by Petrobras from Rio de Janeiro-Galeão to Macaé flew into São João Hill while descending through rain and clouds over the Municipality of São Pedro da Aldeia. All 16 passengers and 2 crew died. The passengers were journalists of well-known Brazilian networks who were preparing a special report about the Campos Basin oil fields.
On February 12, 1990, a Fokker F27 registration PT-LCG operating a flight from São Paulo-Congonhas to Bauru, due to faulty approach procedures, touched down at Bauru 775 m past the runway threshold. The pilot was unable to initiate a go-around procedure and went past the end of the runway, hitting a car that was passing on a road nearby. One crew member and two occupants of the car died.
On October 31, 1996, a Fokker 100 registration PT-MRK and operating as Flight 402 from São Paulo-Congonhas to Rio de Janeiro-Santos Dumont crashed into an urban area during takeoff procedures and after engine no. 2 suffering at least three uncommanded reverse thrust deployments and thus losing power, stalled, rolled to the right and struck two buildings. All 95 passengers and crew on board and 4 people on the ground died.
On July 9, 1997, a Fokker 100 that was on a daily route between Vitória and São Paulo, with a stopover in São José dos Campos, suffered a sudden explosion between seats 18 and 20, which opened a four square meter hole in its fuselage and threw engineer Fernando Caldeira de Moura Campos out of the plane. The passenger fell from a height of 2,400 meters, at a speed of 100 meters per second, creating a 1 meter diameter fault in the ground, in a cassava plantation in the city of Suzano, where he was found. According to the cadaveric report, despite the explosion, it is very likely that Fernando arrived alive and lucid to the ground. Days later, the Federal Police of Brazil indicted unemployed professor Leonardo Teodoro de Castro, who was also traveling on the aircraft, as the author of the explosion. Leonardo, however, could not be judged for what happened, because days after the explosion he was run over by a bus and is in a vegetative state.
On September 15, 2001, a Fokker 100 registration PT-MRN operating the charter Flight 9755, flying from Recife to São Paulo-Congonhas via Campinas-Viracopos, following an uncontrolled engine failure en route to Campinas, had three cabin windows shattered by fragments of the engine and made an emergency landing at Belo Horizonte-Confins. One passenger was sucked out partly and held by another passenger until the aircraft landed. The passenger did not survive.
On July 17, 2007, an Airbus A320-200 registration PR-MBK operating Flight 3054 from Porto Alegre to São Paulo-Congonhas overran the runway while landing at Congonhas, crossed a major thoroughfare and impacted against a TAM Express warehouse. All 187 passengers and crew perished, as did 12 people on the ground.
 On September 28, 2018,  an empty Airbus A320 registration PT-MZJ of more than 18 years old, got off the pusher truck during towing at the São Paulo-Congonhas and the rear hit a palm and other trees. The palm crushed the right rear wing.
On December 20, 2018, a Boeing 777-300ER (PT-MUG) operating as LA8084 from São Paulo-Guarulhos to London Heathrow suffered a serious electrical fault inflight, subsequently diverting to Belo Horizonte International Airport. There were no reported injuries or fatalities. The aircraft was repaired and returned to service.

Subsidiaries
LATAM Cargo Brasil provides cargo services.
Multiplus Fidelidade is the customer loyalty network. On November 8, 2011, Multiplus and the Canadian company Aimia (which also administrates Air Canada's loyalty program Aeroplan) established a joint-venture to create in Brazil a third company that would administer loyalty schemes of other companies.
TAM Aviação Executiva provides air services for business executives.
TAM Viagens provides vacation package services for Brazilians, while TAM Vacations provides vacation package services for Americans.
Cine TAM was a cinema in São Paulo owned by the airline.
TAM Museum was a museum of vintage aircraft located in São Carlos and maintained by TAM Group.

See also
Brasil Central Linhas Aéreas
Helisul Linhas Aéreas
List of airlines of Brazil

References

External links

TAM Linhas Aéreas (Archive)
Timetable Images of TAM/Brasil Central

Airlines of Brazil
Brazilian brands
Companies based in São Paulo
Companies formerly listed on the New York Stock Exchange
Companies that have filed for bankruptcy in Brazil
Latin American and Caribbean Air Transport Association
Airlines established in 1961
São Carlos
B
Former Star Alliance members
Former Oneworld members
1976 establishments in Brazil